Hyrbyair Marri (born 1968) is a Pakistani activist from the province of Balochistan. He is the fifth son of the Baloch nationalist leader Khair Bakhsh Marri. As of 2017, he resides in London, England.

Early life
Hyrbyair was born in Quetta, Balochistan as the fifth son of Khair Bakhsh Marri, the sardar of the Marri tribe. Hyrbyair's elder brothers are Changez Marri, Balach Marri, Ghazan Marri and Hamza Marri; his younger brother is Mehran Baluch. In 1980 he came to the United Kingdom with his family, before they moved to Afghanistan in 1981 during General Muhammad Zia-ul-Haq's regime. He completed his early education in Quetta, Balochistan and Kabul, Afghanistan; before moving to Moscow, Russia for higher education at the Moscow State University.

Political activities and asylum
Marri returned to Balochistan in 1992. His father was too old to start a new political struggle so his brother Balach Marri took his father's place. In 1996, Hyrbyair was elected to the Provincial Assembly of Balochistan and was appointed Education Minister of the province. In 2000, Balochistan Police arrested and charged his father with the murder of Balochistan High Court justice Nawaz Marri; Hyrbyair left Balochistan for Britain at this time.

The Government of Pakistan alleges that Marri is the leader of the Balochistan Liberation Army, which is designated a terrorist organization by Pakistan, the United Kingdom and the United States, but he was tried and acquitted of terrorism charges by a British court in 2009. The British government granted his request for political asylum in 2011.

Further reading

References

Tumandars
Nawabs of Balochistan, Pakistan
Baloch politicians
1968 births
Living people
Balochistan MPAs 1997–1999
British people of Baloch descent
Marri family
Provincial ministers of Balochistan